SERCODAK Dalfsen is a handball club from Dalfsen, Netherlands. They currently compete in the Eredivisie.

Honours 

 AFAB Eredivisie
 Winners (6) : 	2011, 2012, 2013, 2014, 2015, 2016

 Dutch Cup
 Winners (5) : 2012, 2013, 2014, 2015, 2017

 Dutch Supercup
 Winners (6) : 2011, 2012, 2013, 2014, 2015, 2017

Former players  
  Angela Malestein
  Kelly Dulfer
  Fabienne Logtenberg
  Sharina van Dort 
  Esther Schop
  Lynn Knippenborg 
  Martine Smeets
  Larissa Nusser
 Annick Lipman
  Nyala Krullaars

External links
 Official website
 EHF Profile

Dutch handball clubs
Handball clubs established in 2009
2009 establishments in the Netherlands
Sports clubs in Overijssel
Dalfsen